The Dhi Qar governorate election of 2009 was held on 31 January 2009 alongside elections for all other governorates outside Iraqi Kurdistan and Kirkuk.

Results

References 

2009 Iraqi governorate elections
Dhi Qar Governorate